Fred Thomas Saberhagen (May 18, 1930 – June 29, 2007) was an American science fiction and fantasy author most famous for his Berserker series of science fiction short stories and novels.

Saberhagen also wrote a series of vampire novels in which the famous Dracula is the main protagonist, and a series of post-apocalyptic mytho-magical novels beginning with his popular Empire of the East series and continuing through a long series of Swords and Lost Swords novels. Saberhagen died of cancer, in Albuquerque, New Mexico.

Biography
Saberhagen was born in and grew up in the area of Chicago, Illinois. Saberhagen served as an enlisted man in the U.S. Air Force during the Korean War while he was in his early twenties. Back in civilian life, Saberhagen worked as an electronics technician for the Motorola Corporation from 1958 to 1962, when he was around 30 years old.

It was while he was working for Motorola that Saberhagen started writing fiction seriously at the age of about 30. His first sale was to Galaxy Magazine, which published his short story "Volume PAA–PYX" in 1961. "Fortress Ship", his first "Berserker" short shory, was published in 1963. Then, in 1964, Saberhagen saw the publication of his first novel, The Golden People.

From 1967 to 1973, he worked as an editor for the Chemistry articles in the Encyclopædia Britannica as well as writing its article on science fiction. He then quit and took up writing full-time. In 1975, he moved to Albuquerque, New Mexico.

He married fellow writer Joan Spicci in 1968. They had two sons and a daughter. On June 29, 2007, Saberhagen died of prostate cancer in Albuquerque.

In his adult years, Fred Saberhagen was a practicing Catholic; indications of his faith appear from time to time in his writing.

Works

References

Further reading
 Wilgus, Neal (1985). "Saberhagen's New Dracula: The Vampire as Hero". In Darrell Schweitzer (ed.), Discovering Modern Horror. Mercer Island, WA: Starmont House, pp. 92–98.

External links

Fantastic Fiction Author Page

1977 article by Saberhagen on the Berserker series in Algol magazine
1980 article by Saberhagen on the Berserker series from The Great Science Fiction Series, ed. Frederik Pohl, Martin H. Greenberg & Joseph Olander, Harper & Row 1980
1991 interview with Saberhagen in Starlog magazine
1997 interview with Saberhagen in Talebones magazine
2001 interview with Saberhagen at Crescent Blues
2004 interview with Saberhagen at Baen Books
Obituary from the Albuquerque Tribune
Fred Saberhagen's online fiction at Free Speculative Fiction Online

1930 births
2007 deaths
20th-century American novelists
21st-century American novelists
American fantasy writers
American male novelists
American science fiction writers
Writers from Chicago
Writers from Albuquerque, New Mexico
Deaths from cancer in New Mexico
Deaths from prostate cancer
American people of Norwegian descent
American male short story writers
20th-century American short story writers
21st-century American short story writers
Novelists from Illinois
Catholics from New Mexico
20th-century American male writers
21st-century American male writers